HeuristicLab is a software environment for heuristic and evolutionary algorithms, developed by members of the Heuristic and Evolutionary Algorithm Laboratory (HEAL) at the University of Applied Sciences Upper Austria, in Hagenberg im Mühlkreis.
HeuristicLab has a strong focus on providing a graphical user interface so that users are not required to have comprehensive programming skills to adjust and extend the algorithms for a particular problem. In HeuristicLab algorithms are represented as operator graphs and changing or rearranging operators can be done by drag-and-drop without actually writing code. The software thereby tries to shift algorithm development capability from the software engineer to the user and practitioner. Developers can still extend the functionality on code level and can use HeuristicLab's plug-in mechanism that allows them to integrate custom algorithms, solution representations or optimization problems.

History 
Development on HeuristicLab was started in 2002 by Stefan Wagner and Michael Affenzeller. The main motivation for the development of HeuristicLab was to build a paradigm-independent, flexible, extensible, and comfortable environment for heuristic optimization on top of a state-of-the-art programming environment and by using modern programming concepts. As the Microsoft .NET framework seemed to fulfill this requirements it was chosen as the development environment and C# as programming language. 
The first officially available version of HeuristicLab was 1.0 released in 2004 with an improved version 1.1 released in 2005. Development on the next version of HeuristicLab started in the same year. Among many things it was decided that HeuristicLab 2.0 should provide an entirely new user experience and lift the burden of programming off of the user. Therefore, HeuristicLab 2.0 was the first version featuring graphical tools for creating algorithms, however due to the complexity of the user interface HeuristicLab 2.0 was never released to the public. In the summer of 2007 it was decided that a new iteration of HeuristicLab was needed which should combine the usability of version 1.1 with the algorithm modeling concepts of version 2.0. HeuristicLab 3.0 was released internally in the beginning of 2008. In the next 2 years HeuristicLab was gradually improved which led to the release of version 3.3 in summer 2010 as open source software.

Features 

 Algorithm Designer
 One of the features that distinguishes HeuristicLab from many other metaheuristic software frameworks is the algorithm designer. HeuristicLab allows to model algorithms in a graphical way without having to write any source code. Algorithms in HeuristicLab are a composition of operators which are chained together. This sequence of operators is called the operator graph and can be viewed and edited for any algorithm in HeuristicLab. HeuristicLab also offers a so called Programmable Operator that can include source code which can be written from within HeuristicLab. Seeing how other algorithms work allows to try out new ideas by starting from an existing algorithm and incrementally modifying it. Of course new algorithms can also be created by writing code.

 Experiment Designer
 In HeuristicLab's Experiment Designer different algorithms with different parameter settings and problems can be composed, executed and analyzed. This is very useful for parameter tuning tasks where different parameterizations have to be executed and compared. HeuristicLab offerers a number of tools for graphically analyzing the results.

 Plugin Infrastructure
 Every functionality in HeuristicLab is available as a plugin. Developers can create and reuse plugins to integrate new features and extend the functionality of HeuristicLab.

 Some other features

 Genetic programming models can be simplified. The genetic programming trees can be exported to MATLAB, LaTeX, Excel or other formats.
 Algorithms, problems, experiments, and results can be saved. Algorithms can be executed, pause, saved, restored, and continued.
 Algorithms and experiments can be executed in parallel on multi-core and distributed computing systems.
 Charts can be customized and exported to various image formats.
 Results and other data can be copied to and from Microsoft Excel or other applications.
 Write and solve MIP/LP models with integrated Google OR-Tools
 HeuristicLab can be coupled with external applications, such as simulation models, to optimize their parameters.
 Support for distributed computing (HeuristicLab Hive) based on a master-slave model similar to e.g. Boinc

Supported algorithms 
The following list gives an overview of the algorithms supported by HeuristicLab:

Genetic algorithm-related
 Genetic Algorithm
 Age-layered Population Structure (ALPS)
 Genetic Programming
 Evolution strategy
 CMA-ES
 Island Genetic Algorithm
 Island Offspring Selection Genetic Algorithm
 RAPGA
 SASEGASA
 Offspring Selection Evolution Strategy (OSES)
 Offspring Selection Genetic Algorithm
 Non-dominated Sorting Genetic Algorithm II
 Ensemble Modeling
 Gaussian Process Regression and Classification
 Gradient Boosted Trees
 Gradient Boosted Regression
 Local Search
 Particle Swarm Optimization
 Parameter-less population pyramid (P3) 
 Robust Taboo Search
 Scatter Search
 Simulated Annealing
 Tabu Search
 Variable Neighborhood Search
 Performance Benchmarks
 Cross Validation
 k-Means
 Linear Discriminant Analysis
 Linear Regression
 Nonlinear Regression
 Multinomial Logit Classification
 Nearest Neighbor Regression and Classification
 Neighborhood Components Analysis
 Neural Network Regression and Classification
 Random Forest Regression and Classification
 Support Vector Regression and Classification
 Elastic-Net
 Kernel Ridge Regression
 Decision Tree Regression
 Barnes-Hut t-SNE
 User-Defined Algorithm: Allows to model algorithms within HeuristicLab's graphical modeling tools.

Supported problems 
The following list gives an overview of the problems supported by HeuristicLab:

 Artificial Ant
 Classification
 Clusterin
 Deceptive trap (step)
 Even Parity
 HIFF
 Knapsack
 Bin Packing
 Graph Coloring
 Koza-style Symbolic Regression
 Lawn Mower
 Multiplexer
 NK[P,Q] Landscapes
 OneMax
 Quadratic Assignment
 Job Shop Scheduling
 Orienteering
 Regression
 Robocode
 Single-Objective Test Functions
 Multi-Objective Test Functions
 Symbolic Classification
 Symbolic Regression
 Time Series Prognosis
 Trading
 Grammatical Evolution
 Traveling Salesman
 Probabilistic Traveling Salesman
 Vehicle Routing
 User-defined Problem: A problem which can be defined with HeuristicLab's graphical modelling tools.
 External Evaluation Problem (single- and multi-objective): Allows to use external programs for evaluating solution candidates. This is useful for e.g.  simulation-based optimization. Natively supported applications include e.g. MATLAB and Scilab.

See also 
 Metaheuristics
 Genetic Algorithms
 Genetic Programming
 ECJ, A toolkit to implement Evolutionary Algorithms
 ParadisEO, A metaheuristics framework

References

External links 
 HeuristicLab Homepage
 HEAL Homepage

Heuristic algorithms